Scenic is the first and only full-length album by Denver Harbor, released on October 12, 2004 on Universal Records. It contains re-recorded versions of four of the five tracks from their debut EP Extended Play ("Picture Perfect Wannabe", "Outta My Head", "Satisfied" and "Way Back Home"), as well as two of the three songs from their 2003 demo ("All I Want" and "Move On").

Track listing
 "Xenophobia"
 "Picture Perfect Wannabe"
 "Outta My Head"
 "Satisfied"
 "All I Want"
 "The Ride"
 "Move On"
 "Way Back Home"
 "Twenty Six"
 "Twenty Seven"
 "My Holiday (Save Me)"
 "Let You Go"

Personnel
Dennis Hill – guitar
Chris Lewis – guitar
Aaron Rubin – bass
Ilan Rubin – drums
Will Salazar – vocals, guitar
Mark Trombino – percussion, programming

References

2004 albums
Albums produced by Mark Trombino
Denver Harbor albums